Michael Appleby is an Australian former professional rugby league footballer who played for the Canterbury Bulldogs, Eastern Suburbs and the Parramatta Eels.

Rugby league career
Appleby started his career at Canterbury, where he played as a forward. He featured mostly in the lower grades for the Bulldogs, with only one first-grade appearance. In 1991 he was a member of Canterbury's Under-21s premiership team.

While at Eastern Suburbs he transitioned into a winger and had his breakthrough season in 1993, earning a Rising Star nomination. He scored two tries in Easts' round five win over South Sydney and featured in each of the first eight rounds, before suffering a broken cheekbone.

Following the 1994 season, Appleby moved to the Parramatta Eels and played first-grade at his new club as a lock.

References

External links
Michael Appleby at Rugby League project

Year of birth missing (living people)
Living people
Australian rugby league players
Canterbury-Bankstown Bulldogs players
Sydney Roosters players
Parramatta Eels players
Rugby league second-rows
Rugby league wingers